Michael ben Shabbetai Cohen Balbo (27 March 1411 – after 1484) was a Cretan rabbi, Kabbalist, and Hebrew poet. He came from a prominent rabbinic family, the son of Shabbetai ben Isaiah Balbo, who wrote works of philosophy, Kabbalah, and Biblical commentary.

A manuscript preserved in the Vatican Library contains several works of his, namely: a poem composed in 1453 on the occasion of the Fall of Constantinople and the cessation of the war; a poem lamenting his father's death (1456); a homiletic commentary on Psalm 28; and three sermons preached by Balbo in Khania in 1471, 1475, and 1477 respectively. Another manuscript contains an account of a disputation (vikuaḥ) between Balbo and Moses Ashkenazi on gilgul.

A work entitled Sha'are raḥamim, which is a supercommentary on Maimonides' commentary on the eleventh chapter of Sanhedrin, and a commentary on Ibn Ezra's hymn beginning Eḥad levado be-en samuk, both bear the name of Michael Cohen as author, who is supposed by Moritz Steinschneider to be identical with Balbo.

References

External links
 Vat. ebr. 254 at the Vatican Library
 

1411 births
15th-century Jewish biblical scholars
15th-century Jewish theologians
15th-century Republic of Venice rabbis
Cretan poets
Kabbalists
Rabbis from Crete